The 2013–14 Greek Volleyleague season was the 46th season of the Greek Volleyleague, the highest tier professional volley league in Greece. The winner of the league was Olympiacos, which beat Ethnikos Alexandroupolis in the league's playoff's finals. The clubs Panachaiki and Niki Aiginio were relegated to the Greek A2 League. The MVP of the league was Kostas Christofidelis, player of Olympiacos.

Teams

Regular season

Source: volleyleague.gr

Play-out

6th match didn't need

Play-off (5-8)

Play-off (1-4)

Final standings

References

External links
Greek Volleyleague, Official Page
Greek Volleyball Federation

Volleyball competitions in Greece
2013 in Greek sport
2014 in Greek sport
2013 in volleyball
2014 in volleyball